Indian National FC is an Indian football club based in New Delhi, that last competed in the DSA Senior Division.

History
Indian Nationals Delhi's 2nd oldest club along with New Delhi Heroes FC was founded in 1939.
It won the Delhi Football League 5 times in its history.

After winning DSA Senior Division in 1999 and 2000 they participated in 2.National Football League in 1999-00 and 2000–01 season

In 2008 Amity United acquired the club

In 2010 3rd season of I-League 2nd Division Nationals participated in the tournament.

Honours

League
Delhi Football League
Champions(5)

Other
Lal Bahadur Shastri Cup
Champions(1): 1992
Independence Day Cup
Champions(1): 2000

See also
 List of football clubs in India

References

Association football clubs established in 1939
1939 establishments in India
Football clubs in New Delhi
I-League 2nd Division clubs